Mlinarić is a surname. Notable people with the surname include:

 House of Mlinarić, medieval Croatian noble family
 David Mlinaric, British interior decorator of Slovenian descent
 Marko Mlinarić, Croatian football player
 Petar Mlinarić, Croatian politician

Croatian surnames